Hot Springs High School is a public secondary school in Hot Springs, Montana.  Hot Springs High School is self-administered.

The school, which serves students in grades 9-12, had an enrollment of 74 students as of 2003–2004, according to CCD data and an 11.6 student to teacher ratio.  The school's student body for that year was 58% Caucasian, 34% Native American, 5% Asian, and 3% African American.

The school is outside a CBSA and thus classified rural by the United States Census Bureau.

Mascot
HSHS's team mascot is "Savage Heat."  For many years, the mascot was simply "Savages," but in the wake of a 2000 Tribal Council Resolution denouncing the use of Native Americans as mascots, the Hot Springs school board agreed in 2007 to rename the team.

References

External links
Department of Education IES page for Hot Springs High School

Public high schools in Montana
Schools in Sanders County, Montana